Nesillas is a genus of Old World warbler in the family Acrocephalidae. Established by Harry Church Oberholser in 1899, it contains the following species:
 Grand Comoro brush warbler (Nesillas brevicaudata)
 Subdesert brush warbler (Nesillas lantzii)
 Anjouan brush warbler (Nesillas longicaudata)
 Moheli brush warbler (Nesillas mariae)
 Malagasy brush warbler (Nesillas typica)
 Aldabra brush warbler (Nesillas aldabrana) (extinct)

The name Nesillas is created from the Greek words nēsos, meaning "island" (a reference to Madagascar) and illas, meaning "thrush".

References

 
Acrocephalidae
 
Taxa named by Harry C. Oberholser
Taxonomy articles created by Polbot